Jed Ramon Hansen (born August 19, 1972 in Tacoma, Washington) is a former Major League Baseball second baseman who played for three seasons. He played for the Kansas City Royals from 1997 to 1999, playing in 87 career games.

External links

1972 births
Living people
Major League Baseball second basemen
Kansas City Royals players
Baseball players from Washington (state)
Stanford Cardinal baseball players
Eugene Emeralds players
Fresno Grizzlies players
Indianapolis Indians players
Las Vegas Stars (baseball) players
Louisville RiverBats players
Memphis Redbirds players
Norfolk Tides players
Omaha Golden Spikes players
Omaha Royals players
Springfield Sultans players
Wichita Wranglers players
Wilmington Blue Rocks players
Anchorage Bucs players